The Americas Zone was one of the three zones of the regional Davis Cup competition in 1991.

In the Americas Zone there were two different tiers, called groups, in which teams competed against each other to advance to the upper tier.

Group I
Winners in Group I advanced to the World Group Qualifying Round, along with losing teams from the World Group first round. Teams who lost their respective first-round ties were relegated to the Americas Zone Group II in 1992.

Participating nations

Draw

  and  advance to World Group Qualifying Round.
  relegated to Group II in 1992.

First round

Brazil vs. Peru

Second round

Cuba vs. Paraguay

Brazil vs. Uruguay

Group II
The winner in Group II advanced to the Americas Zone Group I in 1992.

Participating nations

Draw

  promoted to Group I in 1992.

First round

El Salvador vs. Dominican Republic

Trinidad and Tobago vs. Ecuador

Haiti vs. Venezuela

Bahamas vs. Costa Rica

Bolivia vs. Barbados

Eastern Caribbean vs. Guatemala

Jamaica vs. Colombia

Second round

Chile vs. Dominican Republic

Venezuela vs. Ecuador

Bahamas vs. Barbados

Eastern Caribbean vs. Colombia

Third round

Chile vs. Venezuela

Colombia vs. Bahamas

Fourth round

Colombia vs. Chile

References

External links
Davis Cup official website

Davis Cup Americas Zone
Americas Zone